Gustav von Wangenheim (born Ingo Clemens Gustav Adolf Freiherr von Wangenheim; 18 February 1895 – 5 August 1975) was a German nobleman, actor, screenwriter and director.

Life 
Wangenheim was born Ingo Clemens Gustav Adolf Freiherr von Wangenheim in Wiesbaden, Hesse, to parents Eduard Clemens Freiherr von Wangenheim and Minna Mengers. Both of his parents were performers; his father, who used the stage name Eduard von Winterstein, appeared in over 200 films between 1910 and 1960. He briefly served in the Imperial German Army during World War I but was discharged in 1915 because of an eye injury.

Wangenheim made his screen debut in 1914 in Passionels Tagebuch and went on to star in many silent features. Among his works were Fritz Lang's early science fiction film, Frau im Mond (as "Windegger"), and Karl Heinz Martin's Das Haus zum Mond. In 1921, Wangenheim was cast in what would prove to be his most enduring role, that of Thomas Hutter (Jonathan Harker) in F. W. Murnau's Nosferatu. 

A member of the Communist Party of Germany since 1921, Wangenheim founded the Communist theatre company Die Truppe '31 in 1931. Die Truppe '31 produced three plays, authored and directed by Wangenheim, before it was shut down by order of the Nazi regime in 1933.

Wangenheim fled Nazi Germany in the 1930s and found refuge in the Soviet Union. While living in exile at Moscow's Hotel Lux, he continued writing and producing films, such as Der Kampf (1936), an anti-Nazi protest film, and was the head of the German language Cabaret "Kolonne Links". In 1936, during the Stalinist purges, he denounced his colleagues Carola Neher and Anatol Becker as Trotskyites. 

Becker was executed and Neher died in the Gulag system after five years in prison. Von Wangenheim's son later stated the accusations that his father denounced Neher and Becker were one-sided and inaccurate. Gustav von Wangenheim's son claimed his father, after being arrested by the NKVD and a lengthy interrogation, signed a statement that implicated Carola Neher as being "anti soviet" but had in fact explicitly refuted the accusation that Neher and her husband Anatol Becker had planned to murder Stalin.

Wangenheim was a founding member of the National Committee for a Free Germany. After World War II, he returned to East Germany, where he worked for the DEFA as screenwriter and director. 

Wangenheim was married to Inge von Wangenheim from 1931 to 1954. The couple had two sons, Friedel and Edi, and twin daughters, Elisabeth and Eleonora von Wangenheim. Wangenheim died in East Berlin on 5 August 1975 and buried in the Friedrichsfelde cemetery in Berlin.

Filmography
1916: Homunculus, 1. Teil
1916: Passionels Tagebuch
1916: Homunculus. 3. Teil: Die Liebestragödie des Homunculus - Heinrich
1916: Der Letzte eines alten Geschlechtes
1916: Das Leid der Liebe
1917: The Coquette 
1918: Ferdinand Lassalle - Janko von Rakowitza
1919: Kitsch. Tragödie einer Intrigantin
1919: Der Tempel der Liebe
1919: Die Welteroberer
1920: Kohlhiesel's Daughters - Paul Seppl
1920: Romeo and Juliet in the Snow - Romeo
1920: Panic in the House of Ardon
1920: Der Tempel der Liebe
1921: The House on the Moon - Andreas, sein Sohn
1922: Nosferatu - Hutter
1922: The Fire Ship
1923: The Pilgrimage of Love - Dr. Egil Rostrup
1923: The Stone Rider - Jäger
1923: Schatten – Eine nächtliche Halluzination - Her lover
1929: Woman in the Moon - Ingenieur Hans Windegger
1931: Danton - Desmoulins (final film role)
1936: Der Kampf (director / writer)
1948: Und wieder 48 (director / writer)
1949: Hoegler's Mission (director / writer)
1953-1954: Gefährliche Fracht (director)
1955: Heimliche Ehen (director / writer)
1955-1956: Lied über dem Tal (director)

References in popular culture
In the 2000 film Shadow of the Vampire, which depicted the production of Nosferatu, Eddie Izzard portrayed Wangenheim.
Footage of Wangenheim's performance as Hutter appears in the Queen video for "Under Pressure."

References

External links

Official Homepage of Gustav von Wangenheim
Official Homepage of his father, Eduard von Winterstein

1895 births
1975 deaths
People from Wiesbaden
People from Hesse-Nassau
Barons of Germany
Communist Party of Germany politicians
Socialist Unity Party of Germany members
German anti-fascists
German male film actors
Film directors from Hesse
German male silent film actors
20th-century German male actors
Refugees from Nazi Germany in the Soviet Union
National Committee for a Free Germany members
Recipients of the Patriotic Order of Merit (honor clasp)
Recipients of the National Prize of East Germany